The Mississippi River Tales is a mural containing 24 panels covering nearly  of the -high downtown floodwall in Cape Girardeau, Missouri. It illustrates the history of the area beginning with the Native Americans who inhabited the area between 900 and 1200. Each panel tells a story: Louis Lorimier platting the city in 1793, the transfer of Upper Louisiana from France to the United States in 1804, Missouri gaining statehood in 1821, the coming of the railroad in 1880, the Big Freeze of 1918-19 and the completion of the Bill Emerson Memorial Bridge, among many others.  The paintings are in a style similar to that of painter Thomas Hart Benton. (Pamela Selbert, Chicago Tribune, November 18, 2007). The mural was painted by Chicago artist Thomas Melvin, in collaboration with several local artists, and was dedicated at a public ceremony on July 7, 2005.

Panels

References

External links

Tourist attractions in Cape Girardeau County, Missouri
Buildings and structures in Cape Girardeau, Missouri
Art in Missouri
Murals in Missouri
Native American history of Missouri
2000s murals